William Shakespeare (1564–1616) was an English poet, playwright and actor.

William Shakespeare may also refer to:

People
 William Shakespeare (tenor) (1849–1931), English tenor singer, pedagogue, and composer
 William Shakespeare (inventor) (1869–1950), inventor of the level-winding fishing reel
 William Shakespear (explorer) (1878–1915), explorer of the Arabian Peninsula
 William Harold Nelson Shakespeare (1893–1976), British aviator and sportsman
 William Shakespeare (American football) (1912–1974), American football player
 William Geoffrey Shakespeare (1927–1996), 2nd Baronet Shakespeare of Lakenham, A general practitioner in Aylesbury
William "Bill" Shakespeare (1939-2021), first man to receive the Pfizer–BioNTech COVID-19 vaccine
 William Shakespeare (singer) (1948–2010), stage name of Australian singer John Stanley Cave

Other uses
 William Shakespeare (essay), an 1864 book-length essay by Victor Hugo
 Will Shakespeare (TV series), an ITC Entertainment TV series about the playwright
 Statue of William Shakespeare (New York City), an 1870 statue by John Quincy Adams Ward
 The William Shakespeare, a British Railways train during the 1951 Festival of Britain

See also
 Shakespeare (surname)
 Shakespeare (disambiguation)
 William Shakespeare Burton (1824–1916), Victorian painter